Natasha Calis (born 27 March 1999) is a Canadian actress known best for her role in the 2012 supernatural horror film The Possession, where she plays the role of Emily Brenek, a possessed girl, as well as her role as Claire McDeere in the 2012 Canadian-American television drama series The Firm.

Career 
Calis started acting professionally at age 7 and made her television debut with her role as Annie Cooper in the 2007 television film Christmas Caper.

She is best known for playing Emily Brenek in the film The Possession and Maryann in the film The Harvest. She was also in the NBC television series The Firm. She has also played in the films Donovan's Echo, Daydream Nation  and Sharp as Marbles, a 2008 comedy, as well as a role as voice actress in the animated film Barbie Presents: Thumbelina.

On television, she had an important role in the series The Firm, a role as voice-actress in Dinosaur Train and  roles in the miniseries Impact and Alice. She also played in the television films Christmas Caper, Held Hostage and Gone, as well as When Calls the Heart, a 2013 movie pilot of the television series. She also starred alongside Samantha Morton with the role of Maryann in the film Can't come out to play, which was named The Harvest in the US.

Filmography

References

External links 

1999 births
Living people
Canadian film actresses
Canadian television actresses
Canadian voice actresses
Canadian child actresses
Actresses from Vancouver